Dasht-e Ashkara (also Romanized as Dasht-e Ashkārā) is a village in Ashkara Rural District, Fareghan District, Hajjiabad County, Hormozgan Province, Iran. At the 2006 census, its population was 1,240, in 277 families.

References 

Populated places in Hajjiabad County